Jambhul is a village in India, situated in Mawal taluka of Pune district in the state of Maharashtra.

Administration
The village is administrated by a sarpanch, an elected representative who leads a gram panchayat. In 2019, the village was itself the seat of a gram panchayat.

Demographics
At the 2011 Census of India, the village comprised 368 households. The population of 1794 was split between 986 males and 808 females.

Air travel connectivity 
The closest airport to the village is Pune Airport.

See also
List of villages in Mawal taluka

References

Villages in Mawal taluka